Vytautas Mačernis (5 June 1921 – 7 October 1944) was a Lithuanian poet.

Biography 
Mačernis was born in the village of Šarnelė (now in Plungė district municipality), to the parents Vladas Mačernis and Elžbieta Mačernienė  was the 2nd eldest among his 13 siblings (of whom 6 died in early childhood). He grew up in his home village, where he wrote most of his poems. His grandmother, who died in 1944, appears in most of his poems as a warm and pleasant memory, as the poet's relation with his grandmother was much closer than the one with his mother.

In 1935 he finished Seda Progymnasium and continued his education in Telšiai Gymnasium. It was in the gymnasium that Vytautas started writing poems. His biographers describe his personality as withdrawn and thoughtful during those years.

Vytautas Mačernis studied English language and literature in Kaunas and philosophy at the University of Vilnius. He would attend lectures related to Lithuanistics, as well as those delivered by Vincas Krėvė, Vincas Mykolaitis-Putinas, take part in the seminars by Balys Sruoga. In 1943 when the university was shut down during the Nazi occupation, he went back to his home village, where he self-studied astronomy and physics, translated works of Oscar Milosz, studied French, having had plans to study at the University of Paris, the Sorbonne. Mačernis was keen on languages and could speak German, English, French, Italian, Russian, Latin and Greek, apart from his native Samogitian and Standard Lithuanian ones.

Mačernis died in 1944 after a splinter of artillery projectile explosion hit his head.

Works 

His first poem was published in 1936, the last one – in October 1944.

References

External links 
Poems by Vytautas Mačernisl

1921 births
1944 deaths
Lithuanian male poets
Existentialists
Civilians killed in World War II
Vilnius University alumni
People from Plungė District Municipality
20th-century poets